The Cibiana Pass (1530 m) is a high mountain pass in the southern Dolomites in the province of Belluno in Italy.

It connects Val Boite in the east and Val di Zoldo in the west. The pass road is narrow but open year-round. It has a maximum grade of 15%.

To the north are Monte Pelmo and Monte Rite. Monte Rite can be reached easily from the pass on an old road built during World War I, and fortifications from that era remain on the mountain.

In 2002, Reinhold Messner opened the Dolomite branch of the Messner Mountain Museum.

See also
 List of highest paved roads in Europe
 List of mountain passes

Cibiana
Mountain passes of the Alps